In mathematics, the group of rotations about a fixed point in four-dimensional Euclidean space is denoted SO(4). The name comes from the fact that it is the special orthogonal group of order 4.

In this article rotation means rotational displacement. For the sake of uniqueness, rotation angles are assumed to be in the segment  except where mentioned or clearly implied by the context otherwise.

A "fixed plane" is a plane for which every vector in the plane is unchanged after the rotation. An "invariant plane" is a plane for which every vector in the plane, although it may be affected by the rotation, remains in the plane after the rotation.

Geometry of 4D rotations
Four-dimensional rotations are of two types: simple rotations and double rotations.

Simple rotations
A simple rotation  about a rotation centre  leaves an entire plane  through  (axis-plane) fixed. Every plane  that is completely orthogonal to  intersects  in a certain point . All these 2D rotations have the same rotation angle .

Double rotations

For each rotation  of 4-space (fixing the origin), there is at least one pair of orthogonal 2-planes  and  each of which is invariant and whose direct sum  is all of 4-space. Hence  operating on either of these planes produces an ordinary rotation of that plane. Assuming that 4-space is oriented, then the orientations of the 2-planes  and  can be chosen consistent with this orientation in two ways. If the rotation angles are unequal,  is sometimes termed a "double rotation".

Isoclinic rotations
Such rotations are called isoclinic or equiangular rotations, or Clifford displacements. Beware: not all planes through  are invariant under isoclinic rotations; only planes that are spanned by a half-line and the corresponding displaced half-line are invariant.

Assuming that a fixed orientation has been chosen for 4-dimensional space, isoclinic 4D rotations may be put into two categories. Now assume that only the rotation angle  is specified.

Isoclinic rotations with like signs are denoted as left-isoclinic; those with opposite signs as right-isoclinic. Left- and right-isoclinic rotations are represented respectively by left- and right-multiplication by unit quaternions; see the paragraph "Relation to quaternions" below.

The angle  corresponds to the identity rotation;  corresponds to the central inversion, given by the negative of the identity matrix. These two elements of SO(4) are the only ones that are simultaneously left- and right-isoclinic.

Left- and right-isocliny defined as above seem to depend on which specific isoclinic rotation was selected. Therefore, once one has selected an orientation (that is, a system  of axes that is universally denoted as right-handed), one can determine the left or right character of a specific isoclinic rotation.

Group structure of SO(4)
SO(4) is a noncommutative compact 6-dimensional Lie group.

Each plane through the rotation centre  is the axis-plane of a commutative subgroup isomorphic to SO(2). All these subgroups are mutually conjugate in SO(4).

These groups are maximal tori of SO(4), which are all mutually conjugate in SO(4). See also Clifford torus.

All left-isoclinic rotations form a noncommutative subgroup  of SO(4), which is isomorphic to the multiplicative group  of unit quaternions.

Each left-isoclinic rotation commutes with each right-isoclinic rotation.

The centre of a group is a normal subgroup of that group. The factor group of C2 in SO(4) is isomorphic to SO(3) × SO(3). The factor groups of 3L by C2 and of 3R by C2 are each isomorphic to SO(3). Similarly, the factor groups of SO(4) by 3L and of SO(4) by 3R are each isomorphic to SO(3).

Special property of SO(4) among rotation groups in general
The odd-dimensional rotation groups do not contain the central inversion and are simple groups.

The even-dimensional rotation groups do contain the central inversion  and have the group  as their centre. For even n ≥ 6, SO(n) is almost simple in that the factor group SO(n)/C2 of SO(n) by its centre is a simple group.

SO(4) is different: there is no conjugation by any element of SO(4) that transforms left- and right-isoclinic rotations into each other. Reflections transform a left-isoclinic rotation into a right-isoclinic one by conjugation, and vice versa. The 5D rotation group SO(5) and all higher rotation groups contain subgroups isomorphic to O(4). Like SO(4), all even-dimensional rotation groups contain isoclinic rotations. But unlike SO(4), in SO(6) and all higher even-dimensional rotation groups any two isoclinic rotations through the same angle are conjugate. The set of all isoclinic rotations is not even a subgroup of SO(2), let alone a normal subgroup.

Algebra of 4D rotations
SO(4) is commonly identified with the group of orientation-preserving isometric linear mappings of a 4D vector space with inner product over the real numbers onto itself.

With respect to an orthonormal basis in such a space SO(4) is represented as the group of real 4th-order orthogonal matrices with determinant +1.

Isoclinic decomposition
A 4D rotation given by its matrix is decomposed into a left-isoclinic and a right-isoclinic rotation as follows:

Let

be its matrix with respect to an arbitrary orthonormal basis.

Calculate from this the so-called associate matrix

 has rank one and is of unit Euclidean norm as a 16D vector if and only if  is indeed a 4D rotation matrix. In this case there exist real numbers  and  such that

and

They are each other's opposites.

The rotation matrix then equals

This formula is due to Van Elfrinkhof (1897).

The first factor in this decomposition represents a left-isoclinic rotation, the second factor a right-isoclinic rotation. The factors are determined up to the negative 4th-order identity matrix, i.e. the central inversion.

Relation to quaternions
A point in 4-dimensional space with Cartesian coordinates  may be represented by a quaternion .

A left-isoclinic rotation is represented by left-multiplication by a unit quaternion . In matrix-vector language this is

Likewise, a right-isoclinic rotation is represented by right-multiplication by a unit quaternion , which is in matrix-vector form

In the preceding section (#Isoclinic decomposition) it is shown how a general 4D rotation is split into left- and right-isoclinic factors.

In quaternion language Van Elfrinkhof's formula reads

or, in symbolic form,

According to the German mathematician Felix Klein this formula was already known to Cayley in 1854.

Quaternion multiplication is associative. Therefore,

which shows that left-isoclinic and right-isoclinic rotations commute.

The eigenvalues of 4D rotation matrices
The four eigenvalues of a 4D rotation matrix generally occur as two conjugate pairs of complex numbers of unit magnitude. If an eigenvalue is real, it must be ±1, since a rotation leaves the magnitude of a vector unchanged. The conjugate of that eigenvalue is also unity, yielding a pair of eigenvectors which define a fixed plane, and so the rotation is simple. If they are both zero, all eigenvalues of the rotation are unity, and the rotation is the null rotation.

The Euler–Rodrigues formula for 3D rotations
Our ordinary 3D space is conveniently treated as the subspace with coordinate system 0XYZ of the 4D space with coordinate system UXYZ. Its rotation group SO(3) is identified with the subgroup of SO(4) consisting of the matrices

The 3D rotation matrix then becomes the Euler–Rodrigues formula for 3D rotations

which is the representation of the 3D rotation by its Euler–Rodrigues parameters: .

The corresponding quaternion formula , where , or, in expanded form:

is known as the Hamilton–Cayley formula.

Hopf coordinates
 
Rotations in 3D space are made mathematically much more tractable by the use of spherical coordinates. Any rotation in 3D can be characterized by a fixed axis of rotation and an invariant plane perpendicular to that axis. Without loss of generality, we can take the -plane as the invariant plane and the -axis as the fixed axis. Since radial distances are not affected by rotation, we can characterize a rotation by its effect on the unit sphere (2-sphere) by spherical coordinates referred to the fixed axis and invariant plane:

Because , the points lie on the 2-sphere. While hyperspherical coordinates are also useful in dealing with 4D rotations, an even more useful coordinate system for 4D is provided by Hopf coordinates , which are a set of three angular coordinates specifying a position on the 3-sphere. For example:

Because , the points lie on the 3-sphere.

Without loss of generality, we can choose, respectively, the - and -planes as these invariant planes.

Visualization of 4D rotations

Every rotation in 3D space has a fixed axis unchanged by rotation. The rotation is completely specified by specifying the axis of rotation and the angle of rotation about that axis. Without loss of generality, this axis may be chosen as the -axis of a Cartesian coordinate system, allowing a simpler visualization of the rotation.

In 3D space, the spherical coordinates  may be seen as a parametric expression of the 2-sphere. For fixed  they describe circles on the 2-sphere which are perpendicular to the -axis and these circles may be viewed as trajectories of a point on the sphere. A point  on the sphere, under a rotation about the -axis, will follow a trajectory  as the angle  varies. The trajectory may be viewed as a rotation parametric in time, where the angle of rotation is linear in time: , with  being an "angular velocity".

Analogous to the 3D case, every rotation in 4D space has at least two invariant axis-planes which are left invariant by the rotation and are completely orthogonal (i.e. they intersect at a point). The rotation is completely specified by specifying the axis planes and the angles of rotation about them. Without loss of generality, these axis planes may be chosen to be the - and -planes of a Cartesian coordinate system, allowing a simpler visualization of the rotation.

In 4D space, the Hopf angles  parameterize the 3-sphere. These tori are not the usual tori found in 3D-space. While they are still 2D surfaces, they are embedded in the 3-sphere. The 3-sphere can be stereographically projected onto the whole Euclidean 3D-space, and these tori are then seen as the usual tori of revolution. In these figures, the initial point is taken to be , i.e. on the Clifford torus. In Fig. 1, two simple rotation trajectories are shown in black, while a left and a right isoclinic trajectory is shown in red and blue respectively.

Generating 4D rotation matrices
Four-dimensional rotations can be derived from Rodrigues' rotation formula and the Cayley formula. Let  be a 4 × 4 skew-symmetric matrix. The skew-symmetric matrix  can be uniquely decomposed as

Let  be a 4 × 4 nonzero skew-symmetric matrix with the set of eigenvalues

Then  can be decomposed as

and

Then,

Also,

See also
Laplace–Runge–Lenz vector
Lorentz group
Orthogonal group
Orthogonal matrix
Plane of rotation
Poincaré group
Quaternions and spatial rotation

Notes

References

Bibliography
L. van Elfrinkhof: Eene eigenschap van de orthogonale substitutie van de vierde orde. Handelingen van het 6e Nederlandsch Natuurkundig en Geneeskundig Congres, Delft, 1897.
Felix Klein: Elementary Mathematics from an Advanced Standpoint: Arithmetic, Algebra, Analysis. Translated by E.R. Hedrick and C.A. Noble. The Macmillan Company, New York, 1932.
Henry Parker Manning: Geometry of four dimensions. The Macmillan Company, 1914. Republished unaltered and unabridged by Dover Publications in 1954. In this monograph four-dimensional geometry is developed from first principles in a synthetic axiomatic way. Manning's work can be considered as a direct extension of the works of Euclid and Hilbert to four dimensions.
J. H. Conway and D. A. Smith: On Quaternions and Octonions: Their Geometry, Arithmetic, and Symmetry. A. K. Peters, 2003.

P.H.Schoute: Mehrdimensionale Geometrie''. Leipzig: G.J.Göschensche Verlagshandlung. Volume 1 (Sammlung Schubert XXXV): Die linearen Räume, 1902. Volume 2 (Sammlung Schubert XXXVI): Die Polytope, 1905.

 

 

Four-dimensional geometry
Quaternions
Rotation